The Drumheller Municipal Airport (CEG4) is a general aviation airport located 5.6 km Northwest of Drumheller, Alberta. It was privately developed in 1962 and was purchased by the Town of Drumheller in 1968.

As a general aviation airport, the Drumheller Municipal Airport is dedicated to domestic use and does not have regularly scheduled passenger or cargo services. The airport provides services to government and commercial aircraft, and is the Town of Drumheller's general aviation gateway into Drumheller.

History 
From 1968 to 1972, the airport underwent improvements by the Alberta Department of Transport, which included improvements such as developing the turf runway into gravel, followed by the runway, apron, and taxiway being paved under the same arrangement in 1972.

In 1984, the terminal building was constructed and runway lighting units with navigation beacons were installed. This allowed the airport the opportunity to provide operations 24 hours a day, 7 days a week. Throughout this period of development, the airport also supported a variety of services, including ValAir, a charter passenger service, commercial crop sprayers, and parachute clubs.

Current practices 
As of 2021, Airport Manager Patrick Bonneville aims to provide a selection of beneficial aviation practices. The Drumheller Municipal Airport includes an automated aviation weather system, fuel sales offered 24/7, an arrival and departure lounge, a canteen, courtesy vehicle, hanger rentals, multiple classrooms, and GPS instrument approaches for landing and adverse weather. All of these practices aided in the creation and management of the many services run out of the airport.

Airport activities encompassing those within the Drumheller Municipal Airport itself, as well as those in the surrounding area, include commercial crop spraying, aerial infrared energy surveying, STARs medevac flights, an area for flights associated with federal and provincial governmental operations, and supporting over 1,000 private-aircraft landings. Additionally, the implementation of a crew vehicle provides an option for day visitors to visit the Town of Drumheller.

Today, the Drumheller Municipal Airport acts as an aviation gateway for air tourism throughout the Town of Drumheller – enticing individuals to travel downtown, shop locally, and explore all the common tourist destinations, all the while bringing in a new demographic of visitor to the area.

See also
Drumheller/Ostergard's Airport

References

External links
Airport: Town of Drumheller

External links
Page about this airport on COPA's Places to Fly airport directory

Registered aerodromes in Alberta
Buildings and structures in Drumheller
Starland County